The 2000 NCAA Division I softball season, play of college softball in the United States organized by the National Collegiate Athletic Association (NCAA) at the Division I level, began in February 2000.  The season progressed through the regular season, many conference tournaments and championship series, and concluded with the 2000 NCAA Division I softball tournament and 2000 Women's College World Series.  The Women's College World Series, consisting of the eight remaining teams in the NCAA Tournament and held in Oklahoma City at ASA Hall of Fame Stadium, ended on May 29, 2000.

Conference standings

Women's College World Series
The 2000 NCAA Women's College World Series took place from May 25 to May 29, 2000 in Oklahoma City.

Season leaders
Batting
Batting average: .474 – Jessica Mendoza, Stanford Cardinal
RBIs: 90 – Jenny Topping, Washington Huskies
Home runs: 24 – Jenny Topping, Washington Huskies

Pitching
Wins: 52-7 – Courtney Blades, Southern Miss Golden Eagles
ERA: 0.40 (16 ER/276.0 IP) – Amanda Scott, Fresno State Bulldogs
Strikeouts: 663 – Courtney Blades, Southern Miss Golden Eagles

Records
NCAA Division I season wins:
52 – Courtney Blades, Southern Miss Golden Eagles

NCAA Division I season hit by pitch:
44 – Cheryl Wyrick, Liberty Lady Flames

NCAA Division I season putouts:
765 – Kenya Peters, Southern Miss Golden Eagles

Freshman class walks:
87 – Veronica Nelson, California Golden Bears

Awards
Honda Sports Award Softball:
Courtney Blades, Southern Miss Golden Eagles

All America Teams
The following players were members of the All-American Teams.

First Team

Second Team

Third Team

References